Rote Taube ("Red Dove") is a landmark decision of the Federal Court of Justice of Germany (X ZB 15/67, 27 Mar. 1969), regarding the definition of a technical teaching ("a teaching to methodically utilize controllable natural forces to achieve a causal, perceivable result") in patent law.

References 

German patent case law